"Breaking Free" is a song from the Disney Channel Original Movie High School Musical.

Breaking Free may also refer to:

 The Adventures of Tintin: Breaking Free, an anarchist parody of the popular The Adventures of Tintin series of comics
 Breaking Free, 1995 album by Sugar Minott
 Breaking Free (film), a 2015 documentary film, directed by Sridhar Rangayan

See also
 Break Free (disambiguation)